Ch'aska Urqu (Quechua ch'aska star; tousled, urqu mountain, "star mountain" or "tousled mountain", also spelled Chasca Orkho) is a mountain in the Andes of Bolivia, about  high. It is located in the Potosí Department, Nor Lípez Province, Quemes Municipality, Pelcoya Canton. Ch'aska Urqu lies near the border with Chile, southeast of the Ollagüe (Ullawi) volcano and southwest of Wanaku.

References 

Mountains of Potosí Department